Gymnopilus fagicola is a species of mushroom in the family Hymenogastraceae.

See also

List of Gymnopilus species

External links
Gymnopilus fagicola at Index Fungorum

fagicola
Taxa named by William Alphonso Murrill